Hoseynabad-e Deh Boneh (also Romanized as Ḩoseynābād-e Deh Boneh; also known as Deh Boneh, Ḩoseynābād, and Husainābād) is a village in Bavaleh Rural District, in the Central District of Sonqor County, Kermanshah Province, Iran. At the 2006 census, its population was 172, in 37 families.

References 

Populated places in Sonqor County